The 1994 Mackellar by-election was held in the Australian electorate of Mackellar in New South Wales on 26 March 1994. The by-election was triggered by the resignation of the sitting member, the Liberal Party of Australia's Jim Carlton on 14 January 1994. The writ for the by-election was issued on 18 February 1994. On the same day a by-election was held in Warringah.

The Australian Labor Party did not stand a candidate for the by-election. The main opposition for the seat was writer/journalist, film-maker, Labor supporter and political commentator Bob Ellis, who stood as an independent.

During the by-elections in Mackellar and Warringah the Maverick Far Right Labor MP Graeme Campbell (politician) urged electors to vote for Australians Against Further Immigration (AAFI).

The by-election was won by the Liberal Party's Bronwyn Bishop.

Results

Jim Carlton resigned.

See also
 List of Australian federal by-elections

References

Mackellar by-election
New South Wales federal by-elections
Mackellar by-election